2PM Member's Selection is the third compilation album by South Korean boy band 2PM. It was released on May 21, 2012.

Background
Details of the album were announced on May 18, on the website Naver. They revealed the track list, concept photos, an interview of the group and a preview of the music video for a new version of the song "Only You", previously released on the single Hottest Time of the Day. It was later announced that the physical version of the album was limited to 20,000 copies. The album also includes a 72-page photobook and 8 postcards of the group.

Composition
The album contains versions of all the Korean singles the group released from 2008 to 2011 and some tracks from their mini albums and studio albums, such as Hottest Time of the Day, 2:00PM Time for Change, Don't Stop Can't Stop, Still 2:00PM, 01:59PM and Hands Up. The album also include 2 songs from the compilation album 2PM Best ~2008–2011 in Korea~, exclusively released in Japan; the song "Alive", a solo song by Jun.K, which was already released as a digital single and "Move On", a duet song by the members Junho and Wooyoung.

Songs such as "Only You" were re-recorded to exclude the vocals of Jaebeom, who left the band in 2009.

Track listing

In the iTunes Store version, the album was divided into 2 discs with 9 tracks each, with the song "Alive" on disc 1 and "Move On" on disc 2 (both songs are listed as track 9).

Chart performance

Album chart

Sales and certifications

Release history

References

External links
 
 
 
 
 
 
 
 
 
 
 

2012 compilation albums
2PM albums
Korean-language albums
JYP Entertainment albums